Body wave may refer to one of the following:
Body wave (seismology), a type of  seismic wave
Body wave (dance move)
Body wave (hair style)
Body wave (locomotion), also called undulatory locomotion, in animals
Body Waves, a 1992 comedy film directed by P.J. Pesce